Adelphagrotis indeterminata is a moth of the family Noctuidae. It is found from British Columbia to California.

The wingspan is 30–40 mm. Adults are usually on wing from August to October, but they have been recorded flying in May to July.

Subspecies
Adelphagrotis indeterminata indeterminata
Adelphagrotis indeterminata innotablis

External links
Bug Guide

Noctuinae
Moths of North America
Moths described in 1865